Aubrey (or Alberic of Humbert) was the Archbishop of Reims from 1207 to 1218. He was a warrior prelate, participating in both the Albigensian Crusade of 1209 and the Fifth Crusade. In the latter, he travelled with the Hungarian troops.

Sources
Setton, Kenneth M. (general editor) A History of the Crusades: Volume II — The Later Crusades, 1189 – 1311. Robert Lee Wolff and Harry W. Hazard, editors. University of Wisconsin Press: Milwaukee, 1969.

1218 deaths
People of the Albigensian Crusade
Christians of the Fifth Crusade
Archbishops of Reims
13th-century Roman Catholic archbishops in France
Year of birth unknown
13th-century peers of France
Armed priests